Anthologyland is a compilation album containing material from the new wave band, The Motels, plus work by Warfield Foxes (an earlier incarnation), and solo work by Martha Davis, including a couple of duets with Sly Stone and Ivan Neville.  This two disc album is a collection of alternate takes, demonstrations, live recordings, outtakes, and sound track releases.

Track listing
All tracks are performed by The Motels, unless otherwise listed.
Song version and year are taken from the CD's liner notes.

Disc One
"Every Day Star" (demo, by Warfield Foxes, 1974/5) (Chuck Wada) – 3:36
"Route 66" (live, 1979) (Nelson Riddle) – 2:19
"Boys" (outtake, 1979) (Martha Davis) – 3:59
"Total Control" (live, 1979) (Davis, Marty Jourard) – 5:52
"The Big Hurt" (live, 1980) (Wayne Shanklin) – 2:58
"Celia" (live, 1980) (Davis) – 3:08
"Counting" (live, 1979) (Davis) – 4:28
"Amigo" (outtake, 1979) (Michael Goodroe) – 3:52
"Careful" (alternate take, 1980) (Jourard, Michael Goodroe) – 3:32
"Danger" (alternate take, 1980) (Davis, Tim McGovern) – 3:27
"Slow Town" (from Careful, 1980) (Davis) – 4:19
"Lost but Not Forgotten" (outtake, 1981) (Davis) – 4:27
"Only the Lonely" (alternate/early version, 1981) (Davis) – 3:25
"Mission of Mercy" (live, 1985) (Davis) – 3:00
"Some Things Never Change" (demo, ~1982) (Davis) – 3:28

Disc Two
"Surrender" (outtake, 1982) (Davis) – 2:45
"Room at the Top" (outtake, 1983) (Davis, Steve Goldstein) – 4:12
"Mystery D.J." (outtake, 1983) (Davis, Bernie Taupin) – 3:39
"Suddenly Last Summer" (alternate take, 1983) (Davis) – 4:33
"Remember the Nights" (live on Saturday Night Live, 1984) (Davis, Scott Thurston)- 3:25
"Love and Affection" (Martha Davis & Sly Stone, from the film Soul Man, 1986) (Joan Armatrading) – 4:32
"Nightmares" (Martha Davis, from the film Night of the Creeps, 1986) (Davis, Kevin Gilbert) – 4:38
"In the Jungle (Concrete Jungle)" (from the film Teachers, 1984) (The Motels) – 3:59
"I Can't Believe" (Martha Davis, from the film Miracle Beach, 1992) (Davis, Eric Allaman) – 2:42
"Take My Breath Away" (demo by Martha Davis, for the film Top Gun, 1986) (Giorgio Moroder, Tom Whitlock) – 3:52
"We Never Danced" (from the film Made in Heaven, 1987) (Neil Young) – 4:23
"Next in Line" (demo, by Martha Davis, 1986) (Davis) – 4:31
"Save the Last Dance for Love" (B-Side to "Shame", 1985) ( Davis) – 4:22
"Shame" (demo, by Martha Davis, 1984) (Davis) – 4:47
"Crazy" (demo, by Martha Davis, 1989) (Willie Nelson) – 2:38
"You Got What It Takes" (Martha Davis) (Davis & Ivan Neville, from the film A Smile Like Yours, 1997) – 3:23
"Coco and John" (hidden track by Martha Davis) (Davis) – 3:18

References

2001 compilation albums
The Motels albums